Cybrid may refer to:

Cybrids (medical), a cytoplasmic hybrid
Cybrids, a race of artificially intelligent machines in the Earthsiege computer game universe
Cybrid, an artificial intelligence in a human body in the Hyperion Cantos novels of Dan Simmons
Cybrid, a comic book character published by Maximum Press
Cybrid, a brand of paintball marker